Korean Language Institute (Hangul: 한국어학당 Hanja:) offered by Keimyung University, is located in Daegu of 2.5 million people and one of Korea’s top three cities. (Korean Language and Cultural Center(KLCC)) provides comprehensive Korean education program for students from different countries. The overall goal of this program is to help the students foster a better understanding of the Korean spirit, heritage and Korean history. The campus is two hours by metro from downtown Seoul.

The Korean Language Institute at Keimyung University is one of the designated language institutes for Korean Government Scholarship Program students.

Overview of the Program

Students are placed for each level through tests and interviews

 Various levels: Beginning IㆍII, Intermediate IㆍII, Advanced IㆍII
 Synthetic educational system: reading, listening, speaking and writing
 Average class size: 10 students, no more than 15 in each class
 Classes lasts 4 hours a day, 5 days a week (Mon - Fri), 10weeks (200 hours)

Facilities

Classroom and International Lounge

 Each class is equipped with multi computers
 Comfortable lounges for students from outside Korea

Dormitories

 Shared double room, dining room, computer room, conference room.
 Breakfast and supper on weekdays (Mon - Fri), breakfast, lunch and supper on weekends.

External links 
 Official Website of Keimyung University Korean Language Institute 
 Keimyung University

References